Martin Teffer (born 7 June 1965 in Amsterdam, North Holland) is a retired volleyball player from the Netherlands, who represented his native country at the 1988 and 1992 Summer Olympics, as well as at the 1990 FIVB Volleyball Men's World Championship. He ended up in fifth place at the 1988 Summer Olympics, followed by the silver medal four years later in Barcelona. Teffer later became a volleyball coach.

References
  Dutch Olympic Committee

1965 births
Living people
Dutch men's volleyball players
Dutch volleyball coaches
Volleyball players at the 1988 Summer Olympics
Volleyball players at the 1992 Summer Olympics
Olympic silver medalists for the Netherlands
Olympic volleyball players of the Netherlands
Sportspeople from Amsterdam
Olympic medalists in volleyball

Medalists at the 1992 Summer Olympics